Arenicella xantha is a Gram-negative, rod-shaped, aerobic and non-motile bacterium from the genus of Arenicella which has been isolated from offshore sediments from the Sea of Japan in Russia.

References

Alteromonadales
Bacteria described in 2010